Vrooman is a surname. Notable people with the name include:

 Adam Edward Vrooman (1847–1923), Canadian doctor and politician 
 Carl Schurz Vrooman (1872–1966), Assistant United States Secretary of Agriculture
 Daniel Vrooman (1818–1895), American missionary to China and Australia and cartographer
 John Perry Vrooman (1860–1923), Canadian doctor and politician 
 John W. Vrooman (1844–1929), American lawyer, banker and politician
 Julia Scott Vrooman, an American writer, and local philanthropist
 Peter H. Vrooman (born 1966), American diplomat 
 Tamara Vrooman (born 1968), Canadian businesswoman, CEO of Vancity